The Majesty Demos are the first recorded attempts of progressive band Dream Theater, under their original name, Majesty. The original 1986 tape contained six tracks that were recorded on Mike Portnoy's analog 4-track recorder, and another 4-track recorder obtained from friends at Berklee College of Music. All the band members were about 19 years old at the time of the recording. Only 1,000 copies were recorded on cassette tape and distributed to fans and rock and metal magazines. Portnoy gave one copy to Jim Matheos of Fates Warning, a move that was instrumental in the band's break into the progressive rock scene. The line-up on the initial recording was keyboardist Kevin Moore, bassist John Myung, guitarist John Petrucci, and drummer Mike Portnoy. Chris Collins, the band's singer at the time, had been introduced to the band after a friend heard a demo of him singing a note-for-note version of Queensrÿche's "Queen of the Reich".

Seventeen tracks were released by YtseJam Records under the title The Berklee Demos and were recorded earlier by Portnoy, Petrucci, and Myung at Berklee. These tracks are instrumental. Tracks 11-17 are seven guitar miniatures, recorded by Petrucci and Portnoy late one night to demonstrate double-tracking the guitar. The songs on The Berklee Demos do not include keyboards, except for the cover of Rush's "YYZ", on which Portnoy plays keyboards. These recordings include versions of "Another Won," "Two Far," and "Your Majesty", which would all later appear on The Majesty Demos, though originally they were instrumentals without keyboards. It is for this reason that these three songs actually appear twice on the YtseJam Records re-release, as the CD is a combination of The Berklee Demos and The Majesty Demos.

Track listing

YtseJam Records and InsideOut re-release track listing

Personnel 
 Chris Collins – vocals on tracks 18-23
 Kevin Moore – keyboards on tracks 18-23
 John Myung – bass
 John Petrucci – guitars
 Mike Portnoy – drums; keyboards on track 6

References 

Dream Theater albums
Demo albums
1986 albums